Øksendalsøra is a village in Sunndal Municipality in Møre og Romsdal county, Norway. The village is located along the Sunndalsfjorden at the northern end of the Øksendalen valley.

Øksendalsøra was the administrative centre of the old Øksendal Municipality that existed from 1854 until 1960.  Øksendal Church is located in the village and it is the church for the Øksendal parish, covering the northwestern part of Sunndal Municipality.

See also
Other neighboring villages in Sunndal municipality: Gjøra, Grøa, Hoelsand, Jordalsgrenda, Romfo, Ålvund, and Ålvundeidet.

References

Villages in Møre og Romsdal
Sunndal